Razia Begum Safavi (1700–1776) was a Safavid princess and the royal consort of shah Nader Shah of Persia (r. 1736–1747).

She was the daughter of Sultan Husayn and the sister of Tahmasp II. She was married to Nader Shah in 1729. She had one daughter. In 1736, her spouse became monarch and founded a new dynasty. As a member of the preceding dynasty, she had great symbolic importance and wielded great influence in harem affairs.

References

Safavid princesses
1700 births
1776 deaths
People from Afsharid Iran
18th-century people of Safavid Iran
18th-century Iranian women